José Antonio Saravia or José Antonio Sarabia (Villanueva del Fresno, Spain, 1785 – Kamenetz, now in Ukraine, 2 April 1871) was an army officer during the Napoleonic Wars.

José Antonio Saravia lived in Russia from about 1812. He became a general of the Russian Army in 1843 and was nominated General Inspector of the Russian Military Academies under the Tsars Nikolai I and Alexander II. He married at Kremenetz, now Kamianets-Podilskyi, Larisa Ivanovna. His wife and three children eventually died in Kamenetz.

Possible sibling
It seems that he had another younger brother or half-brother named Manuel José Saravia y Perdigos or Manuel José Sarabia y Perdigos (Oliva de la Frontera, Spain, 1790–1852), who also fought in Spain from the age of 18 (after 1808) against Napoleon, became a lieutenant in a Spanish naval expedition in Napoleonic Denmark, the same as his brother, being also integrated in the Russian Army after the 1812 Battle of Borodino, much like his brother, became a general of the Russian Army in 1824, aged 34, under Tsar Alexander I, Emperor of Russia from 1801 to 1825, much earlier than that José Antonio, and is reported as dying in 1852, much earlier also than his elder brother or half-brother José Antonio.

Villanueva del Fresno, where José Antonio was born, and Oliva de la Frontera, where Manuel José was born, are neighbouring villages in the Province of Badajoz, near Olivenza, and there is only a gap of five years between their respective birthdays.

It seems that the second name of José Antonio was also Perdigos, but we know mostly about rumours mentioning him as born of a single mother and being adopted by his grandparents, named Perdigos.

Notes

References
 José Antonio Saravia a la luz de los documentos (contribución para una futura biografía), Eduardo BARAJAS SALAS,  Revista de educación, ISSN 0213-9529, Nº 1, (1982), pages 1–120.

1785 births
1871 deaths
19th-century Spanish people
Imperial Russian Army generals
Russian military personnel of the Napoleonic Wars
Spanish military personnel of the Napoleonic Wars
Spanish emigrants to the Russian Empire